9th Combat Service Support Battalion (9 CSSB) is a unit of the 9th Brigade of the Australian Army.
Originally formed as 9th Brigade Administrative Support Battalion (9 BASB), 9 CSSB is a part-time Army (Reserve) unit.  The unit is based at Warradale Barracks Adelaide as well as a small sub-unit in Tasmania.

Role
The role of 9 CSSB is to provide first and limited second line support to its customer units within the 9th Brigade.

External links
Australian Army - 9 CSSB

References

Combat service support battalions of the Australian Army

Military units in Tasmania
Military units in South Australia